Anthony Joseph Foyt Jr. (born January 16, 1935) is an American retired auto racing driver who has raced in numerous genres of motorsports. His open wheel racing includes United States Automobile Club Champ cars, sprint cars, and midget cars. He raced stock cars in NASCAR and USAC. He won several major sports car racing events. He holds the USAC career wins record with 159 victories, and the American championship racing career wins record with 67.

He is the only driver to win the Indianapolis 500 (which he won four times—1961, 1964, 1967 and 1977), the Daytona 500, the 24 Hours of Daytona, and the 24 Hours of Le Mans. Foyt won the International Race of Champions all-star racing series in 1976 and 1977. In the NASCAR stock car circuit, he won the 1964 Firecracker 400 and the 1972 Daytona 500. Foyt survived three major crashes that caused serious injuries, and narrowly escaped a fourth. Foyt's success has led to induction in numerous motorsports halls of fame.

In the mid-1960s, Foyt became a team owner, fielding cars for himself and other drivers. Since retiring from active race driving, he has owned A. J. Foyt Enterprises, which has fielded teams in the CART, IRL, and NASCAR.

Early life
Foyt was born in Houston, Texas, to Anthony (Tony) Foyt Sr. (1918-1985) and Emma Evelyn Monk Foyt (1920-1988). His father was an auto mechanic who owned and raced midget race cars as a hobby. Foyt's father built A. J. a toy racer with a lawnmower engine when he was five years old. Tony recalled that when he and his wife left an eleven-year-old A. J. home to attend a race, they returned to find the boy had done considerable damage to the home driving the family's other race car in the yard, and had caused the car's engine to catch on fire. While angry, the older Foyt did accept the likelihood of A. J. having a future as a driver. A. J. attended Pershing and Hamilton middle schools and Lamar, San Jacinto and St. Thomas Catholic high schools, but he dropped out to become a mechanic and spend more time concentrating on racing. When he obtained a driver's license, Foyt purchased a used Oldsmobile and practiced the mechanical skills he had learned working on his father's cars on it. He also began street racing with the car until discovered by his father.

Driving career

Midget car career
Foyt began racing midgets in 1953 at age 18 in a car owned and maintained by his father. He started his USAC career in a midget car at the 1956 Night before the 500 in Anderson, Indiana. His first midget car win was at a 100 lap event at Kansas City in 1957, and finished seventh in the season points standings. He left midget cars after the 1957 season to drive in sprint cars and Championship Car. He did occasionally compete in midget car events. He won the 1960 and 1961 Turkey Night Grand Prix, the first two years that it was held at Ascot Park. He won the 1961 Hut Hundred after starting last, and finished seventh in National Midget points that year. He won the 1970 Astro Grand Prix, an event that he promoted in his hometown of Houston. He ended his career with 20 midget car feature wins. Even after he had reached the pinnacle of his sport, Foyt was known to make occasional appearances in small, local events as a way of thanking promoters who had supported him in his struggle up the ladder.

In 1975 and 1976, Foyt won the Australian Speedcar Grand Prix at the Liverpool International Speedway in Sydney when the speedway had an asphalt surface. (In Australia Midgets are called Speedcars.)

Sprint car career
Foyt began his sprint car career in 1956, at age 21, driving the Les Vaughn Offy with the International Motor Contest Association. On August 24, 1956, Foyt outqualified a field of 42 drivers at the Minnesota State Fair and, the following day, he won his first sprint car race, running away with the IMCA feature at the Red River Fair in Fargo, N.D. On June 16, 1957, on the high banked asphalt track at Salem, Indiana, Foyt came out on top in a race-long battle with Bob Cleberg. That victory put Foyt on the radar for USAC car owners and he switched from the IMCA to USAC later that season. Foyt eventually won 28 USAC National sprint car feature races and the USAC Eastern Championship in 1960. Foyt continued to race sprint cars long after he was firmly established as one of the top drivers at the Indy 500.

Championship car career

In 1958, he made his debut at Indy, but he spun out of the race on lap 148. In 1961, he became the first driver to successfully defend his points championship and win the Indianapolis 500 race. Late in the 500, Foyt made a pit stop for fuel, but a refueling malfunction meant that he returned to the race without enough fuel to finish. Eddie Sachs, unaware that Foyt's now-quicker car was light on fuel, pushed hard to keep up—and Sachs had to pit from the lead with just three laps remaining to replace a shredded right rear tire. Foyt pitted again also but only for enough fuel to finish. He took over the lead and beat Sachs by just 8.28 seconds—the second-closest finish in history at the time. He raced in each season from 1957 to 1992, starting in 374 races and finishing in the top ten 201 times, with 67 victories. In 1958, Foyt raced in Italy in the Trophy of the Two Worlds on the banking at Monza.

Ford-powered entries were widely expected to dominate the 1964 Indianapolis 500. Discussions between Ford officials and Foyt (who had a stock car contract with Ford at the time) took place early in the month of May about the possibility of Foyt taking over the third Team Lotus-Ford, a team reserve vehicle. Foyt wanted the use of the car for the entire month, but Lotus team owner Colin Chapman was reluctant to promise him the reserve car, in case something happened to cars driven by team drivers Jim Clark and Dan Gurney.

So discussions ended and Foyt stayed with his reliable, well-sorted Offenhauser-engined roadster. In the 1964 season, Foyt won a record 10 of 14 races en route to his championship, including the Indy 500. When the two fastest Lotus-Fords, driven by Jim Clark and Bobby Marshman, fell out of the race with mechanical problems, and Parnelli Jones was knocked out when his fuel tank exploded during a pit stop, Foyt was left alone at the front of the field, and cruised home to win his second Indianapolis 500. The race is remembered for the fiery second-lap crash that claimed the lives of Dave MacDonald and Eddie Sachs. Foyt did not learn of the fate of his two friends until he reached victory lane, and was handed a newspaper with a headline announcing the tragedy.

In August 1965, at the Milwaukee  Championship Car race, Foyt's rear-engined Lotus pavement car was not at the track. So Foyt unloaded the Offenhauser-engined dirt track car he had won the  race with at Springfield the previous day. He sprayed the mud off the car, installed pavement tires and a set-up for the one mile (1.6 km) oval. Foyt received permission to take two extra warm up laps during qualifying, as he had no time for practice. He then qualified the car on the pole, led the race for 18 out of 200 laps but then had to stop for a new rear tire, and finished second to Gordon Johncock, driving a rear-engined Gerhardt-Offy Indy car.

In the 1967 Indianapolis 500, Parnelli Jones' STP-Paxton Turbocar was expected to easily defeat the field of piston engines. Jones lapped the field, but his car expired with three laps remaining, and Foyt inherited the lead.  As Foyt moved through turn four on the 200th lap, he had a premonition of trouble and slowed down. A few hundred yards ahead of him, Carl Williams spun out as he exited turn four, triggering a five-car front-stretch accident right in front of Foyt. Traveling at no more than 100 mph, Foyt threaded his way through the wreckage and safely took the checkered flag. The race took two days to complete when rain stopped the race on the 18th lap on the first day.

In the 1977 Indianapolis 500, Foyt ran out of fuel, and had to make a pit stop. He had to make up around 32 seconds on Gordon Johncock. Foyt made up 1.5 to 2 seconds per lap by turning up his turbo boost, which risked destroying the engine. Johncock's own engine expired just as Foyt had closed to within eight seconds after both drivers' final pit stops, and Foyt passed for the win.

In 1981, Foyt was involved in an accident at the Michigan 500 and nearly lost an arm. It took him a while to get back to full fitness; and at the Indy 500 the following year he qualified third.

Foyt won the Indianapolis 500 four times, in 1961, 1964, 1967 and 1977. He is the first driver to have done so. The feat has since been matched by Al Unser (1970, 1971, 1978, 1987);  Rick Mears (1979, 1984, 1988, 1991); and, Helio Castroneves (2001, 2002, 2009, and 2021). Of his 67 career Championship Car race victories, twelve were won at Trenton Speedway. Foyt also won the Indycar Series seven times, a record that still stands. Foyt qualified for the Indy 500 an amazing 35 times consecutively.

In the 1982 Indianapolis 500, Foyt started on the front row but on the pace laps he was victimized by a controversial wreck when 2nd-year driver Kevin Cogan suddenly spun out for no apparent reason. Seven cars were involved in the incident including Foyt and Mario Andretti, who was unable to continue.  Foyt was livid with Cogan and famously said "That damn Coogan," on live radio, and when asked by Chris Economaki in a TV interview what had happened, Foyt shouted, "I don't know, he just ran right square into my Goddamn left front! (Economaki: "Who are you talking about?") Cogan!" Foyt repaired his car during the red flag and led the first quarter of the race but dropped out due to lingering damage from the crash.

In a 1990 CART race at Road America in Elkhart Lake, Wisconsin Foyt's car left the track and plowed straight through a dirt embankment, severely injuring his legs and feet.  After multiple surgeries and months of physiotherapy he returned for the 1991 Indianapolis 500 and qualified second. He had announced his retirement before the race but changed his mind after being caught up in an early incident. He returned for a 35th consecutive start at the 1992 Indianapolis 500 and avoided all of the day's numerous crashes to finish ninth.

Sports car racing
Foyt is famous for winning the prestigious 24 Hours of Le Mans race in his first and only attempt, in 1967; Foyt drove a Ford GT40 Mk IV, partnered with Dan Gurney and entered by Carroll Shelby's team. Prior to the race, he had angered the French fans and press by remarking that the notoriously fast and dangerous tree-lined course was "nothin' but a little old country road."  Also, he reportedly only got 10 laps of pre-race practice. But when Gurney overslept and missed a driver change in the middle of the night, Foyt was forced to double-stint and wound up driving nearly 18 hours of the 24-hour race. Foyt also later won the 12 Hours of Sebring and 24 Hours of Daytona in 1985 driving Porsches, making him the fourth of only 9 drivers to complete the infromal "triple crown" of endurance racing.

Stock car career

USAC Stock Car
He was the champion in USAC's stock car in 1968, 1978, and 1979. He finished second in 1963 and 1969, and third in 1970.  Among his wins in USAC stock car racing was his 1964 win at the Billy Vukovich Memorial 200 at Hanford Speedway in California.  He also was a multiple winner in USAC stockers at Milwaukee, Texas World Speedway, and Michigan International Speedway.

NASCAR
Foyt, a veteran who had been racing professionally for eight seasons before trying his hand at NASCAR racing, only needed ten races to get his first victory. Richard Petty dominated the 1964 Firecracker 400 until he dropped out with engine problems. Foyt swapped the lead with Bobby Isaac for the final 50 laps of the summer event at the Daytona International Speedway. Foyt passed Isaac on the final lap to win the race.

In January 1965, Foyt qualified and ran in the front of the pack most of the day with Dan Gurney and Parnelli Jones in the Motor Trend 500 at Riverside. Parnelli retired with mechanical issues, leaving Gurney and Foyt to contest the lead. Late in the race, dueling with Gurney, Foyt spun. His car refired, and he charged through the field in an attempt to regain lost positions. After running hard to catch leader Gurney, Foyt's brakes failed entering turn nine at the end of Riverside's mile-long, downhill back straight. Foyt turned the car into the infield at more than 100 mph, was launched off an embankment, dropped into a lower area and slammed into a sandy embankment, violently tumbling end-over-end several times. The track doctor at Riverside International Raceway pronounced Foyt dead at the scene of the severe crash, but fellow driver Parnelli Jones revived him after seeing movement. Foyt suffered severe chest injuries, a broken back, and a fractured ankle. Footage of his flipping No. 00 Ford, owned by Holman Moody, is featured in the final scene of the movie Red Line 7000.

Foyt ran out of gas near the end of the 1971 Daytona 500, and Petty passed him for the win. Foyt again had the car to beat in the 1972 Daytona 500, but this time succeeded in a dominant performance. Only three drivers led during the race. In 1979 at the Daytona 500, Foyt was running in fifth place, but when Cale Yarborough and Donnie Allison had their famous tangle on the final lap, Foyt finished in the third spot behind Darrell Waltrip and Richard Petty who again won the race. When Foyt pulled up next to Petty after the checkers to congratulate him, he was called "a true gentleman" during the broadcast.

Foyt won the 1971 and 1972 races at the Ontario Motor Speedway for Wood Brothers Racing. The track was shaped like the Indianapolis Motor Speedway. The 1972 race was his last NASCAR points win; his final win in a NASCAR race was in the first of Daytona's 125-mile qualifying heats in 1978, driving a self-fielded superspeedway Buick.

In 1988 Foyt was banned from NASCAR for six months and fined $5,000 following a series of incidents during the Winston 500 at Talladega Superspeedway. NASCAR’s vice president of competition Les Richter reviewed the incident and lifted the suspension. However, his fine was raised to $7,500.

Foyt's final NASCAR Winston Cup Series race was the 1994 Brickyard 400, the inaugural running of that race. Foyt finished 30th, four laps behind winner Jeff Gordon. Foyt entered the race again in 1995 and 1996, but failed to qualify both times. In 1995, his attempt was stymied when rain washed out second round time trials.

Foyt ended up racing three times in the early days of the NASCAR Craftsman Truck Series, with a best finish of 18th coming in the 1995 GM Goodwrench / Delco Battery 200, a race for which he qualified ninth.

Career summary
Foyt drove in the Indianapolis 500 for 35 consecutive years, winning it four times (the first of only four to have done so).
Foyt is the only driver to have won the Indy 500 in both front and rear-engined cars, having won twice with both configurations.
Foyt is the only driver to have won the 24 Hours of Le Mans (with Dan Gurney), and the Indianapolis 500 the same year (1967).
He is the only person to have recorded victories in the Indianapolis 500, the Daytona 500 stock car race, the 24 Hours of Daytona (1983 and 1985 with co-driver Bob Wollek), the 24 Hours of Le Mans international sports car endurance race in Le Mans, France, as well as the 12 Hours of Sebring (his last major professional win, in 1985, with co-driver Bob Wollek).
 He is one of only 12 drivers to have completed the Triple Crown of endurance racing (victories in the 12 Hours of Sebring, 24 Hours of Daytona and 24 Hours of Le Mans).
He also has 41 USAC Stock Car wins and 50 Sprint Car, Midget, and Dirt Champ Car wins.
He won the 1975 and 1976 Australian Speedcar Grand Prix at the Liverpool International Speedway in Sydney (in Australia midgets are called Speedcars).
He has won 12 total major driving championships in various categories.
His USAC wins tally is a record 138 (The late Rich Vogler is second with 132.)
Foyt won the 1976 and 1977 IROC championships.
Foyt won seven NASCAR races.
Foyt and Mario Andretti are the only drivers to have won both the Indianapolis and Daytona 500s.
 Foyt is the last living driver, who started in the Races of Two Worlds. In 1958 Event at Autodromo Nazionale Monza, he, then virtually unknown rookie of USAC, replaced Maurice Trintignant in Sclavi & Amos car #55 after heat 1.
He set the record on 27 August 1987 at a 7.712-mile (12.411 km) test track near Fort Stockton, Texas.
Despite having won more USAC sanctioned events than any other driver Foyt never won a CART sanctioned event.

Awards
Foyt was inducted into the International Motorsports Hall of Fame in 2000.
Foyt was named in NASCAR's 50 Greatest Drivers list in 1998.
He was named in the National Sprint Car Hall of Fame in 1990.
He was inducted into the Motorsports Hall of Fame of America as the only open wheel driver in the first class of 1989.
He was inducted into the National Midget Auto Racing Hall of Fame in 1988.
He was inducted into the Indianapolis Motor Speedway Hall of Fame in 1978.

Indianapolis 500 records
Foyt has numerous career records at the Indianapolis 500: the first of four drivers to have won the Indianapolis 500 four times, the most consecutive and career starts (35), most races led (13), most times led during the career (39), and most competitive laps and miles during a career (4,909 laps, 12,272.5 miles).
In the 1961 Indianapolis 500 Foyt won over Eddie Sachs with a lead of 8.28 seconds, the second closest finish in Indianapolis history at the time.  Shortly thereafter, Foyt and Ray Harroun (who won the first Indianapolis 500 in 1911) appeared together on a segment of the TV program I've Got a Secret—their secret being their respective wins 50 years apart.

As of June 2022, Foyt stands as not only the second-oldest living winner of the Indianapolis 500 (only Parnelli Jones is older), but the oldest with the earliest win (1961).

Car owner

While an active driver, Foyt entered into a longtime partnership with Kalamazoo, Michigan businessman Jim Gilmore, and raced under the Gilmore-Foyt Racing name for many years. The team built its own Coyote chassis from 1966 to 1983.

After retiring as a driver, he continued his involvement in racing as a car owner of A. J. Foyt Enterprises in the CART series, then the Indy Racing League (IRL) and NASCAR.

Scott Sharp took a share of the 1996 Indy Racing League (IRL) title driving for Foyt while Kenny Bräck won the 1998 IRL title, also in a Foyt car. Bräck won the 1999 Indianapolis 500 in Foyt's car, putting Foyt in the winner's circle at Indy for the fifth time. The current drivers for his Indycar team, A. J. Foyt Enterprises, are Kyle Kirkwood and Dalton Kellett.
On June 7, 1997, Foyt (as an owner) was involved in an incident that added to his reputation as a man of little patience. One of his drivers, Billy Boat, had been declared the winner of the inaugural IRL race at Texas Motor Speedway that had been held that night, and his other driver, Davey Hamilton, had come in second. However, Dutch driver Arie Luyendyk disputed Boat's win, claiming that he was in the lead when a scoring error by USAC (who had scored all IRL races up until that time) gave Boat the checkered flag. When Luyendyk entered victory lane after the race to confront TMS general manager Eddie Gossage about the finish uttering obscenities, an irate Foyt approached Luyendyk from behind and slapped and shoved him into a tulip bed (coincidentally given Luyendyk's Dutch nationality). Luyendyk then requested a review of the race; a few days later, USAC reversed its position and declared Luyendyk the winner; Foyt kept the victory lane-awarded trophy. Following the controversy, the IRL relieved USAC of the scoring duties for its events.

Family
Jerry Foyt is the son of A.J. Foyt. Foyt is the grandfather of A. J. Foyt IV. Foyt is the grandfather and adoptive father of Larry Foyt. He is also the godfather of driver John Andretti. When not busy with the racing season, A. J. Foyt likes to spend time at the family Ranch, The Foyt Ranches located in Hockley, Texas and Del Rio, Texas.

The Foyts are also, via marriage, part of the ownership group of the Indianapolis Colts.  A. J. Foyt IV is married to the daughter of Colts owner Jim Irsay.

Racing record

Complete Formula One World Championship results
(key)

USAC results
(key) (Races in bold indicate pole position)

CART
(key) (Races in bold indicate pole position)

Indianapolis 500 results

Indianapolis 500 qualifying results

24 Hours of Le Mans results

NASCAR
(key) (Bold – Pole position awarded by qualifying time. Italics – Pole position earned by points standings or practice time. * – Most laps led.)

Grand National Series

Winston Cup Series

Daytona 500

Craftsman Truck Series

International Race of Champions
(key) (Bold – Pole position. * – Most laps led.)

References

 The Greatest 33 Profile

External links

Biography 
Official team owner website
Biography at official website (archived)

A. J. Foyt: King of the Indy 500
International Motorsports Hall of Fame page (archived)
The Greatest 33
 Foyt, A.J. and David Goldstein. A.J. Foyt Oral History, Houston Oral History Project, July 22, 2008.

Living people
1935 births
San Jacinto High School alumni
Lamar High School (Houston, Texas) alumni
Racing drivers from Houston
Bonneville 200 MPH Club members
24 Hours of Le Mans drivers
24 Hours of Le Mans winning drivers
24 Hours of Daytona drivers
Indianapolis 500 drivers
Indianapolis 500 polesitters
Indianapolis 500 winners
Champ Car champions
Champ Car drivers
IndyCar Series team owners
NASCAR drivers
NASCAR team owners
USAC Silver Crown Series drivers
USAC Stock Car drivers
International Race of Champions drivers
International Motorsports Hall of Fame inductees
National Sprint Car Hall of Fame inductees
American racehorse owners and breeders
World Sportscar Championship drivers
12 Hours of Sebring drivers
People from Hockley, Texas
Walker Racing drivers
A. J. Foyt Enterprises drivers